Carmella Danielle DeCesare Garcia (born July 1, 1982) is an American model who was Playboy magazine's Miss April 2003 and Playmate of the Year for 2004. She is also known for her time in WWE as a WWE Diva search contestant. She was featured in the 2008 Sports Illustrated Swimsuit Issue in the players' wives feature.

Early life
Carmella DeCesare was born July 1, 1982. A native of Avon Lake, Ohio, she is of Italian and Puerto Rican ancestry.

Career

Modeling career
Carmella DeCesare came to Playboy's attention after she applied to a Fox reality show Who Wants to Be a Playboy Centerfold search. After she was selected as a finalist, she withdrew from the competition due to having second thoughts about the endeavor. When Playboy publisher Hugh Hefner learned this, he invited her to his birthday party and convinced her to change her mind. She was subsequently chosen as a Playboy Cyber Girl of the Week, then a Cyber Girl of the Month before becoming Playboy's Miss April in 2003.

DeCesare appeared in the 2005 Playmates at Play at the Playboy Mansion swimsuit calendar as calendar girl of March. The calendar was the inaugural Playmates at Play calendar and it was shot on the grounds of the Playboy Mansion in 2004. It was Playboys first attempt at creating a non-nude swimsuit calendar featuring Playmates similar in style with those from Sports Illustrated Swimsuit Issue. In 2005, DeCesare received breast implants. In an episode of the E! reality-TV series The Girls Next Door in August 2005, she said that her implants looked fake because they were new and had not fully settled.

DeCesare modeled in the 2008 Sports Illustrated Swimsuit Issue.

Professional wrestling career

World Wrestling Entertainment (2004) 
DeCesare made her first World Wrestling Entertainment (WWE) appearance as a contestant in the 2004 WWE Diva Search.  Following the Diva Search she feuded with Diva Search winner Christy Hemme which led to a Lingerie Pillow Fight match at Taboo Tuesday. She left the promotion soon after.

Charity work
DeCesare and her husband, Jeff Garcia, founded the Garcia Pass It On Foundation in order to share resources with people in less fortunate circumstances.

Legal issues
On September 10, 2004, DeCesare pleaded not guilty to assault in a Cleveland, Ohio court after a fight in a bar on August 21, 2004 with a woman named Kristen Hine. She was acquitted of the assault charge on January 12, 2005 but found guilty of violating a restraining order. She was sentenced to do twenty-four hours of community service, given one year probation, and fined $150. During the trial, DeCesare testified that Jeff Garcia, her boyfriend at that time and the quarterback for the Cleveland Browns, had been involved in an affair with Hine after DeCesare's and Garcia's relationship began. Garcia commented, "It's embarrassing that I am here today, to be caught up in a situation like this."

Personal life
On April 21, 2007, DeCesare married then-NFL quarterback Jeff Garcia at the CordeValle Resort in San Martin, California. Their first daughter, Presley, was born on April 28, 2008. The couple welcomed their second child, a son, Jason in June 2009. The couple's third child, a son named Jax was born on September 21, 2010. In December 2011, their fourth child, a daughter, Faith was born.

References

Other sources
"Carmella DeCesare". Cleveland Magazine. v. 34, n. 1. January 2005. 71.
 Bill Lubinger. "PTA presidents, grandmas and actresses: Ohio-linked playmates have nothing to hide". The Plain Dealer. December 1, 2003.

External links

 

1982 births
Living people
People acquitted of assault
People from Avon Lake, Ohio
2000s Playboy Playmates
Playboy Playmates of the Year
Hispanic and Latino American Playboy Playmates
WWE Diva Search contestants
Professional wrestlers from Ohio
American female professional wrestlers
American professional wrestlers of Italian descent
21st-century American women